Zesius chrysomallus, the redspot, is a species of lycaenid or blue butterfly found in Sri Lanka and India.

Description

The host plants of the larvae include Terminalia catappa and Smilax zeylanica.

References

Theclinae
Butterflies described in 1819
Butterflies of Sri Lanka
Butterflies of Asia
Taxa named by Jacob Hübner